Anthony Paul "Tony" McCarthy (born 9 November 1969) is an Irish retired footballer who is currently the physiotherapist at Shamrock Rovers.

Career
Tony started his League of Ireland career with University College Dublin in 1987. During his last season at Belfield Park he was capped by the Republic of Ireland U21 in April 1990 at Oriel Park.

After two seasons, he transferred to Derry City where he gained two further U21 caps. After just one season at the Brandywell he signed for Shelbourne. His one season at Tolka Park was a huge success as Shels won the League of Ireland , Tony was named PFAI Young Player of the Year. and a further two U21 caps came his way.

After five years in England he returned to Shels where he went on to win further major honors. During this time he conceded two penalties against Rangers in the UEFA Cup in 1998.

Honours
 League of Ireland: 5
 Shelbourne - 1991/92, 1999/00, 2001/02, 2003, 2004
 FAI Cup: 2
 Shelbourne - 1993, 2000
 PFAI Young Player of the Year:
 Shelbourne - 1991/92

References

External links

Living people
Association footballers from County Dublin
Republic of Ireland association footballers
Republic of Ireland under-21 international footballers
League of Ireland players
Association football defenders
University College Dublin A.F.C. players
Derry City F.C. players
Shelbourne F.C. players
Millwall F.C. players
Crewe Alexandra F.C. players
Colchester United F.C. players
English Football League players
1969 births